Yamagata (written: 山形 or 山像) is a Japanese surname. Notable people with the surname include: 

Yamagata Aritomo (1838–1922), Japanese military leader and politician
Yamagata Bantō (1748–1821), Japanese scholar and merchant
Hiro Yamagata (artist) (born 1948), Japanese artist based in Los Angeles, California
Hiro Yamagata (born 1964), Japanese author, critic, economist, and translator
Isao Yamagata (1915–1996), Japanese film actor
Kakuko Yamagata (born 1969), Japanese singer
Kaori Yamagata (born 1963), Japanese voice actress
Kyohei Yamagata (born 1981), Japanese football player
Yamagata Masakage (1524–1575), Japanese samurai
Rachael Yamagata (born 1977), American singer-songwriter
Ryota Yamagata (born 1992), Japanese sprinter
Tatsunori Yamagata (born 1983), Japanese football player
Yukio Yamagata (born 1957), Japanese singer, actor, and voice actor
Yusuke Yamagata (born 1986), Japanese footballer

Japanese-language surnames